Vattavayalil Joseph Kurian was the Additional Chief Secretary to the Government of Kerala in India was the Managing Director of Cochin International Airport. He belongs to the 1983 batch of the Indian Administrative Service (IAS), Kerala cadre.

Personal life
V. J. Kurian was born to V. J. Joseph, Vattavayalil House and Aleykutty Joseph, Pamblani House at Edamattom, Palai in Kottayam District, Kerala. He is married to Mariamma Kurian and has one son and one daughter. V. Joseph Thomas IPS is his elder brother. He currently lives in Cochin, Kerala and serves as the Managing Director of the Cochin International Airport Limited.

Under his leadership, the airport won the distinction of being the world's first solar powered airport. He received the champion of the earth award from the UN for contributions to the field of sustainable energy.

In 1973-1974 he completed his Secondary School (SSLC) from St Joseph English Medium School Neeloor, a small village near Pala. 

He has a master's degree in Economics from St. Stephen's College, Delhi.

Career

Kurian joined the Kerala cadre of the Indian Administrative Service in 1983 and has held various positions in the bureaucracy. He has been the Managing Director(MD) of 'Oushadhi', a state run pharma company, Spices board Chairman and MD of Roads and Bridges Development Corporation Kerala. He was the collector of Ernakulam where his role was instrumental in setting up the first public private partnership airport of India, Cochin International Airport Limited (CIAL). He has had three terms as the MD of CIAL and was awarded the M. K. K. Nair Award in 2017.

References

External links
 UPSC official website
 Vattavayalil Family website

Indian police chiefs
Malayali people
People from Pala, Kerala
1958 births
Living people
Civil Servants from Kerala
Indian Administrative Service officers from Kerala